Song Soo-Young (born 8 July 1991) is a South Korean footballer who plays as striker for Suwon FC in K League 2.

Career
He signed with Gyeongnam FC before 2014 season.

References

External links 

1991 births
Living people
Association football forwards
South Korean footballers
Gyeongnam FC players
Jeju United FC players
Suwon FC players
Gimcheon Sangmu FC players
K League 1 players
K League 2 players
Yonsei University alumni
Place of birth missing (living people)